The South Island, also officially named , is the larger of the two major islands of New Zealand in surface area, the other being the smaller but more populous North Island. It is bordered to the north by Cook Strait, to the west by the Tasman Sea, and to the south and east by the Pacific Ocean. At low altitude, it has an oceanic climate.

The South Island is shaped by the Southern Alps which run along it from north to south. The high Kaikōura Ranges lie to the northeast. The east side of the island is home to the Canterbury Plains while the West Coast is famous for its rough coastlines such as Fiordland, a very high proportion of native bush and national parks, and the Fox and Franz Josef Glaciers. The main centres are Christchurch and Dunedin. The economy relies on agriculture and fishing, tourism, and general manufacturing and services.

Although it constitutes 56% of New Zealand's land area, the South Island is home to only % of New Zealand's  million inhabitants. After the 1860s gold rushes in the early stages of Pākehā (European) settlement of the country, the South Island had the majority of the European population and wealth. The North Island's population overtook the South Island's in the early 20th century, with 56% of the New Zealand population living in the North Island in 1911. The drift north of people and businesses continued throughout the twentieth century.

Naming and usage

In the 19th century, some maps identified the South Island as Middle Island or New Munster, and the name South Island or New Leinster was used for today's Stewart Island / Rakiura. In 1907, the Minister for Lands gave instructions to the Land and Survey Department that the name Middle Island was not to be used in the future. "South Island will be adhered to in all cases".

Although the island had been known as the South Island for many years, in 2009 the New Zealand Geographic Board found that along with the North Island, the South Island had no official name. After a public consultation, the board officially named the island South Island or Te Waipounamu in October 2013.

Said to mean "the Water(s) of Greenstone", Te Waipounamu possibly evolved from Te Wāhi Pounamu ("the Place of Greenstone"). The island is also known as Te Waka a Māui which means "Māui's Canoe". In some modern alliterations of Māori legends, the South Island existed first, as the boat of Māui, while the North Island was the fish that he caught. Various Māori iwi sometimes use different names, with some preferring to call the South Island Te Waka o Aoraki, referring to another Māori legend called the story of Aoraki, as after the world was created Aoraki and his three brothers came down in a waka to visit their mother, Papatūānuku the earth mother, only to crash after failing to perform a karakia on their way back home to their father, Ranginui (also known as Raki) the sky father, in turn causing the waka to transform into an island and the four brothers into the mountain ranges on top of it.

In prose, the two main islands of New Zealand are called the North Island and the South Island, with the definite article. It is also normal to use the preposition in rather than on, for example "Christchurch is in the South Island", "my mother lives in the South Island". Maps, headings, tables, and adjectival expressions use South Island without "the".

As it is 32% larger than the North Island but contains less than a quarter of the country's population, the South Island is sometimes humorously nicknamed the "mainland" of New Zealand by its residents.

History

Pre-history 
Charcoal drawings can be found on limestone rock shelters in the centre of the South Island, with over 500 sites stretching from Kaikōura to North Otago. The drawings are estimated to be between 500 and 800 years old and portray animals, people and fantastic creatures, possibly stylised reptiles. Some of the birds pictured are long extinct, including moa and Haast's eagles. They were drawn by early Māori, but by the time Europeans arrived, local Māori did not know the origins of the drawings.

Classical Māori period 
Early inhabitants of the South Island were the Waitaha. They were largely absorbed via marriage and conquest by the Kāti Māmoe in the 16th century.

Kāti Māmoe were in turn largely absorbed via marriage and conquest by the Kāi Tahu who migrated south in the 17th century. While today there is no distinct Kāti Māmoe organisation, many Kāi Tahu have Kāti Māmoe links in their whakapapa and especially in the far south of the island.

Around the same time a group of Māori migrated to Rēkohu (the Chatham Islands), where, in adapting to the local climate and the availability of resources, they eventually evolved into a separate people known as the Moriori with its own distinct language – closely related to the parent culture and language in mainland New Zealand. One notable feature of the Moriori culture, an emphasis on pacifism, proved disadvantageous when Māori warriors arrived in the 1830s aboard a chartered European ship.

In the early 18th century, Kāi Tahu, a Māori tribe who originated on the east coast of the North Island, began migrating to the northern part of the South Island. There they and Kāti Māmoe fought Ngāi Tara and Rangitāne in the Wairau Valley. Ngāti Māmoe then ceded the east coast regions north of the Waiau Toa / Clarence River to Kāi Tahu. Kāi Tahu continued to push south, conquering Kaikōura. By the 1730s, Kāi Tahu had settled in Canterbury, including Banks Peninsula. From there they spread further south and into the West Coast.

In 1827-1828 Ngāti Toa under the leadership of Te Rauparaha successfully attacked Kāi Tahu at Kaikōura. Ngāti Toa then visited Kaiapoi, ostensibly to trade. When they attacked their hosts, the well-prepared Kāi Tahu killed all the leading Ngāti Toa chiefs except Te Rauparaha. Te Rauparaha returned to his Kapiti Island stronghold. In November 1830 Te Rauparaha persuaded Captain John Stewart of the brig Elizabeth to carry him and his warriors in secret to Akaroa, whereby subterfuge they captured the leading Kāi Tahu chief, Tama-i-hara-nui, and his wife and daughter. After destroying Tama-i-hara-nui's village they took their captives to Kapiti and killed them. John Stewart, though arrested and sent to trial in Sydney as an accomplice to murder, nevertheless escaped conviction.

In the summer of 1831–32 Te Rauparaha attacked the Kaiapoi pā (fortified village). Kaiapoi was engaged in a three-month siege by Te Rauparaha, during which his men successfully sapped the pā. They then attacked Kāi Tahu on Banks Peninsula and took the pā at Onawe. In 1832–33 Kāi Tahu retaliated under the leadership of Tūhawaiki and others, attacking Ngāti Toa at Lake Grassmere. Kāi Tahu prevailed, and killed many Ngāti Toa, although Te Rauparaha again escaped. Fighting continued for a year or so, with Kāi Tahu maintaining the upper hand. Ngāti Toa never again made a major incursion into Kāi Tahu territory.

In 1836, the Ngāti Tama chief Te Puoho led a 100-person war party, armed with muskets, down the West Coast and over the Haast Pass. They fell on the Ngāi Tahu encampment between Lake Wānaka and Lake Hāwea, capturing ten people and killing and eating two children. Te Puoho took his captives over the Crown Range to Lake Wakatipu and thence to Southland where he was killed and his war party destroyed by the southern Ngāi Tahu leader Tuhawaiki.

Kāi Tahu and Ngāti Toa established peace by 1839, with Te Rauparaha releasing the Kāi Tahu captives he held. Formal marriages between the leading families in the two tribes sealed the peace.

European contact 
The first Europeans known to reach the South Island were the crew of Dutch explorer Abel Tasman who arrived in his ships Heemskerck and Zeehaen. In December 1642, Tasman anchored at the northern end of the island in Golden Bay / Mohua which he named Moordenaar's Bay (Murderers Bay) before sailing northward to Tonga following a clash with Māori. Tasman sketched sections of the two main islands' west coasts. Tasman called them Staten Landt, after the States General of the Netherlands, and that name appeared on his first maps of the country. Dutch cartographers changed the name to Nova Zeelandia in Latin, from Nieuw Zeeland, after the Dutch province of Zeeland. It was subsequently Anglicised as New Zealand by British naval captain James Cook of HM Bark Endeavour who visited the islands more than 100 years after Tasman during (1769–1770).

The first European settlement in the South Island was founded at Bluff in 1823 by James Spencer, a veteran of the Battle of Waterloo.

In January 1827, the French explorer Jules Dumont d'Urville arrived in Tasman Bay / Te Tai-o-Aorere on the corvette Astrolabe. A number of landmarks around Tasman Bay were named by d'Urville and his crew including d'Urville Island, French Pass and Torrent Bay.

European settlement 
Following the signing of the Treaty of Waitangi from February 1840, Lieutenant-Governor Captain William Hobson declared British sovereignty over New Zealand in May 1840 and the South Island, along with the rest of New Zealand, briefly became a part of the Colony of New South Wales.<ref>A. H. McLintock (ed), An Encyclopaedia of New Zealand", 3 vols, Wellington, NZ:R.E. Owen, Government Printer, 1966, vol 3 p. 526.</ref> This declaration was in response to France's attempts to colonise the South Island at Akaroa and the New Zealand Company attempts to establish a separate colony in Wellington, and so Hobson declared British sovereignty over all of New Zealand on 21 May 1840 (the North Island by treaty and the South by discovery). Seven days after the declaration, the Treaty was signed at Akaroa on 28 May.

On 17 June 1843, Māori and British settlers clashed at Wairau in what became known as the Wairau Affray. Also known as the Wairau Massacre in most older texts, it was the first serious clash of arms between the two parties after the signing of the Treaty of Waitangi and the only one to take place in the South Island. Four Māori died and three were wounded in the incident, while among the Europeans the toll was 22 dead and five wounded. Twelve of the Europeans were shot dead or clubbed to death after surrendering to Māori who were pursuing them.

The Otago Settlement, sponsored by the Free Church of Scotland, took concrete form in Otago in March 1848 with the arrival of the first two immigrant ships from Greenock (on the Firth of Clyde) – the John Wickliffe and the Philip Laing. Captain William Cargill, a veteran of the Peninsular War, served as the colony's first leader: Otago citizens subsequently elected him to the office of Superintendent of the Province of Otago.

While the North Island was convulsed by the New Zealand Wars of the 1860s and 1870s, the South Island, with its low Māori population, was generally peaceful. In 1861 gold was discovered at Gabriel's Gully in Central Otago, sparking a gold rush. Dunedin became the wealthiest city in the country and many in the South Island resented financing the North Island's wars.

In the 1860s, several thousand Chinese men, mostly from the Guangdong province, migrated to New Zealand to work on the South Island goldfields. Although the first Chinese migrants had been invited by the Otago Provincial government they quickly became the target of hostility from white settlers and laws were enacted specifically to discourage them from coming to New Zealand.

Government and politics

The South Island has no separately represented country subdivision, but is guaranteed 16 of the electorates in the New Zealand House of Representatives. A two-tier structure constituted under the Local Government Act 2002 gives the South Island (and its adjacent islands) seven regional councils for the administration of regional environmental and transport matters and 25 territorial authorities that administer roads, sewerage, building consents, and other local matters. Four of the territorial councils (one city and three districts) also perform the functions of a regional council and are known as unitary authorities.

When New Zealand was separated from the colony of New South Wales in 1841 and established as a Crown colony in its own right, the Royal Charter effecting this provided that "the principal Islands, heretofore known as, or commonly called, the 'Northern Island', the Middle Island', and 'Stewart's Island', shall henceforward be designated and known respectively as 'New Ulster', 'New Munster', and 'New Leinster'".

These divisions were of geographical significance only, not used as a basis for the government of the colony, which was centralised in Auckland. New Munster consisted of the South Island. The name New Munster was given by the Governor of New Zealand, Captain William Hobson, in honour of Munster, the Irish province in which he was born.

The situation was altered in 1846 when the New Zealand Constitution Act 1846 divided the colony into two provinces: New Ulster Province (the North Island north of the mouth of the Patea River), and New Munster Province (and the southern portion of the North Island, up to the mouth of the Patea River, the South Island and Stewart Island). Each province had a Governor and Legislative and Executive Council, in addition to the Governor-in-Chief and Legislative and Executive Council for the whole colony. The 1846 Constitution Act was later suspended, and only the provincial government provisions were implemented. Early in 1848 Edward John Eyre was appointed Lieutenant-Governor of New Munster.

The Provincial Council of New Munster had only one legislative session, in 1849, before it succumbed to the virulent attacks of settlers from Wellington. Governor Sir George Grey, sensible to the pressures, inspired an ordinance of the General Legislative Council under which new Legislative Councils would be established in each province with two-thirds of their members elected on a generous franchise. Grey implemented the ordinance with such deliberation that neither Council met before advice was received that the United Kingdom Parliament had passed the New Zealand Constitution Act 1852.

This act dissolved these provinces in 1853, after only seven years' existence, and New Munster was divided into the provinces of Wellington Province, Canterbury, Nelson, and Otago. Each province had its own legislature known as a Provincial Council that elected its own Speaker and Superintendent.

Secession movements have surfaced several times in the South Island. A Premier of New Zealand, Sir Julius Vogel, was amongst the first people to make this call, which was voted on by the New Zealand Parliament as early as 1865. The desire for the South Island to form a separate colony was one of the main factors in moving the capital of New Zealand from Auckland to Wellington that year.

Several South Island nationalist groups emerged at the end of the 20th century and beginning of the 21st. The South Island Party fielded candidates in the 1999 general election but cancelled its registration in 2002. Several internet based groups advocate their support for greater self determination.

On 13 October 2010, South Island Mayors led by Bob Parker of Christchurch displayed united support for a Southern Mayoral Council. Supported by Waitaki Mayor Alex Familton and Invercargill Mayor Tim Shadbolt, Bob Parker said that increased cooperation and the forming of a new South Island-wide mayoral forum were essential to representing the island's interests in Wellington and countering the new Auckland Council.

Administrative divisions

There are 23 territorial authorities within the South Island: 4 city councils and 19 district councils. Three territorial authorities (Nelson City Council, and the Tasman and Marlborough District Councils) also perform the functions of a regional council and thus are known as unitary authorities.

 Total of Christchurch City and Banks Peninsula areas.
 Includes Stewart Island and Solander Islands.

Political parties
This is a list of political parties, past and present, who have their headquarters in the South Island.
 Aotearoa Legalise Cannabis Party
 Imperial British Conservative Party
 National Democrats Party
 New Munster Party
 New Zealand Democratic Party
 New Zealand Progressive Party
 South Island Party

 Demographics 

 Population 

Compared to the more populated and multi-ethnic North Island, the South Island has a smaller, more homogeneous resident population of   According to the Statistics New Zealand Subnational Population Projections: 2006–2031; the South Island's population will increase by an average of 0.6 percent a year to 1,047,100 in 2011, 1,080,900 in 2016, 1,107,900 in 2021, 1,130,900 in 2026 and 1,149,400 in 2031.

The South Island had a population of 1,149,564 at the 2018 New Zealand census, an increase of 91,058 people (8.6%) since the 2013 census, and an increase of 127,251 people (12.4%) since the 2006 census. There were 571,656 males and 577,914 females, giving a sex ratio of 0.99 males per female. Of the total population, 199,788 people (17.4%) were aged up to 15 years, 231,939 (20.2%) were 15 to 29, 519,519 (45.2%) were 30 to 64, and 198,330 (17.3%) were 65 or older.

 Culture and identity 
At the 2018 New Zealand census, 84.8 percent of South Islanders identified as of European ethnicity, 10.0 percent as Māori, 8.7 percent as Asian, 2.9 percent as Pacific Peoples, 1.2 percent as Middle Eastern/Latin American/African, and 1.4 percent as another ethnicity (mainly 'New Zealander'). Totals add to more than 100% since people may identify with multiple ethnicities.

The proportion of South Islanders born overseas was 21.4%. The most common foreign countries of birth are England (22.0% of overseas-born residents), Australia (8.8%), the Philippines (7.9%), Mainland China (6.5%) and India (5.4%).

Around 48.6 percent of South Islanders affiliate with Christianity and 3.1 percent affiliate with non-Christian religions, while 45.8 percent are irreligious. Anglicanism is the largest Christian denomination in the South Island with 12.7 percent affiliating, closely followed by Catholicism at 12.1 percent and Presbyterianism at 11.7 percent.

Urbanisation
There are 15 urban areas in the South Island with a population of 10,000 or more:

Economy

The South Island economy is strongly focused on tourism and primary industries like agriculture. The other main industry groups are manufacturing, mining, construction, energy supply, education, health and community services.

The subnational gross domestic product (GDP) of the South Island was estimated at NZ$68.02 billion in the year to March 2019, 22.4% of New Zealand's national GDP. The subnational GDP per capita was estimated at $59,254 in the same period.

Energy
The South Island is a major centre for electricity generation, especially in the southern half of the island and especially from hydroelectricity. In 2010, the island generated  of electricity, 41.5% of New Zealand's total electricity generation. Nearly all (98.7%) of the island's electricity is generated by hydroelectricity, with most of the remainder coming from wind generation.

The three large hydro schemes in the South Island: Waitaki, Clutha, and Manapouri, together produce nearly 92% of the island's electricity. The Waitaki River is the largest hydroelectric scheme, consisting of nine powerhouses commissioned between 1936 and 1985, and generating about  annually, around 18% of New Zealand's electricity generation and more than 30% of all its hydroelectricity.
The Clutha River / Mata-Au has two major stations generating electricity: Clyde Dam (432 MW, commissioned 1992) and Roxburgh Dam (360 MW, commissioned 1962). Manapouri Power Station is an isolated station located in Southland, generating 730 MW of electricity and producing  annually - the largest single hydroelectric power station in the country.

While most of the electricity generated in the South Island is transported via the  grid (plus 110 kV and 66 kV connectors) to major demand centres, including Christchurch, Dunedin, and Tiwai Point Aluminium Smelter, around one-sixth of it is exported to the North Island to meet its large (and increasing) power demands via the HVDC Inter-Island link. The 611 km HVDC Inter-Island was commissioned in 1965, linking Benmore Dam on the Waitaki River in Southern Canterbury, with Haywards substation in Lower Hutt in the North Island, with cables crossing Cook Strait between Ōraumoa / Fighting Bay and Oteranga Bay. While the majority of the time the South Island exports electricity to the North Island via the link, it is also used to import thermally-generated North Island electricity in years of low hydro levels.

Offshore oil and gas is likely to become an increasingly important part of the South Island economy into the future. Origin Energy has formed a joint venture with Anadarko Petroleum, the second-largest independent US natural gas producer to begin drilling for oil in the Canterbury Basin off the coast of Dunedin. Market analyst, Greg Easton from Craigs Investment Partners commented that such a substantial find it could well turn Dunedin from the Edinburgh of the south to the Aberdeen of the south.

In July 2007 the New Zealand Government awarded oil and gas exploration permits for four areas of the Great South Basin, situated in the volatile waters off the Southern Coast of New Zealand. The three successful permit holders are:
 a consortium led by ExxonMobil New Zealand (Exploration) Limited (United States) which includes local company Todd Exploration Limited (New Zealand);
 a consortium led by OMV New Zealand Limited (Austria) which includes PTTEP Offshore Investment Company Ltd (Thailand), Mitsui Exploration and Production Australia Pty Ltd (Japan); and
 Greymouth Petroleum Limited (New Zealand)

Stock exchanges
Due to the gold rushes of the 1860s, the South Island had regional stock exchanges in Christchurch, Dunedin and Invercargill – all of which were affiliated in the Stock Exchange Association of New Zealand. However, in 1974 these regional exchanges were amalgamated to form one national stock exchange, the New Zealand Stock Exchange (NZSE). Separate trading floors operated in both Christchurch and Dunedin until the late 1980s. On 30 May 2003, New Zealand Stock Exchange Limited formally changed its name to New Zealand Exchange Limited, trading as NZX.

Today, the Deloitte South Island Index is compiled quarterly from publicly available information provided by NZX, Unlisted and Bloomberg. It is a summary of the movements in market capitalisation of each South Island-based listed company. A company is included in the Index where either its registered office and/or a substantial portion of its operations are focused on the South Island.

Trade unions

There are several South Island-based trade union organisations. They are:

 Furniture, Manufacturing & Associated Workers Union
 New Zealand Building Trades Union
 New Zealand Meat & Related Trades Workers Union
 Southern Amalgamated Workers' Union

Tourism

Tourism is a huge earner for the South Island. Popular tourist activities include sightseeing, adventure tourism, such as glacier climbing and Bungee jumping, tramping (hiking), kayaking, and camping. Numerous walking and hiking paths, including six of the New Zealand Great Walks, are located in the South Island and are renowned internationally.

An increase in direct international flights to Christchurch, Dunedin and Queenstown has boosted the number of overseas tourists.

Fiordland National Park, Abel Tasman National Park, Westland Tai Poutini National Park, Aoraki / Mount Cook National Park, Queenstown, Kaikōura, and the Marlborough Sounds are regarded as the main tourism destinations in the South Island and amongst the Top 10 destinations in New Zealand.

Ski areas and resorts

This is a list of ski areas and resorts in the South Island.

Transport

Road transport

Rail transport

The South Island's railway network has two main lines, two secondary lines, and a few branch lines. The Main North Line from Picton to Christchurch and the Main South Line from Lyttelton to Invercargill via Dunedin together comprise the South Island Main Trunk Railway. The secondary Midland Line branches from the Main South Line in Rolleston and passes through the Southern Alps via the Otira Tunnel to the West Coast and its terminus in Greymouth. In Stillwater, it meets the other secondary route, the Stillwater - Westport Line, which now includes the Ngakawau Branch.

A number of other secondary routes are now closed, including the Otago Central Railway, the isolated Nelson Section, and the interdependent Waimea Plains Railway and Kingston Branch. An expansive network of branch lines once existed, especially in Canterbury, Otago, and Southland, but these are now almost completely closed. The branch lines that remain in operation serve ports (Bluff Branch and Port Chalmers Branch), coal mines (Ohai Branch and Rapahoe Branch), and a dairy factory (Hokitika Branch). The first 64 km of the Otago Central Railway remain in operation for tourist trains run by Dunedin Railways (formerly Taieri Gorge Railway). The most significant freight is coal from West Coast mines to the port of Lyttelton for export.

Passenger services were once extensive. Commuter trains operated multiple routes around Christchurch and Dunedin, plus a service between Invercargill and Bluff. Due to substantial losses, these were cancelled between the late 1960s and early 1980s.  The final services to operate ran between Dunedin's City Centre and the suburb of Mosgiel, and they ceased in 1982.  Regional passenger trains were once extensive, but are now limited to the Coastal Pacific from Christchurch to Picton and the TranzAlpine from Christchurch to Greymouth.

The Southerner between Christchurch and Invercargill, once the flagship of the network, was cancelled on 10 February 2002. Subsequently, the architecturally significant Dunedin Railway Station has been used solely by the TGR's tourist trains, the Taieri Gorge Limited along the Otago Central Railway and the Seasider to Palmerston. Rural passenger services on branch lines were provided by mixed trains and Vulcan/88 seater railcars but the mixeds had largely ceased to exist by the 1950s and the railcars were withdrawn in the mid-1970s.

The South Island saw the final use of steam locomotives in New Zealand. Locomotives belonging to classes long withdrawn elsewhere continued to operate on West Coast branches until the very late 1960s, when they were displaced by DJ class diesels. In comparison to most countries, where steam locomotives were last used on insubstantial rural and industrial operations, the last services run by steam locomotives were the premier expresses between Christchurch and Invercargill: the South Island Limited until 1970 and the Friday and Sunday night services until 1971. This was due to the carriages being steam-heated. The final steam-hauled service in New Zealand, headed by a member of the JA class, ran on 26 October 1971.

Water transport

Dunedin was the headquarters of the Union Steam Ship Company, once the largest shipping company in the Southern Hemisphere.

Ports and harbours
Container ports: Lyttelton (Christchurch), Port Chalmers (Dunedin)
Other ports: Nelson, Picton, Westport, Greymouth, Timaru, Bluff.
Harbours: Akaroa Harbour, Otago Harbour, Halfmoon Bay (Stewart Island / Rakiura), Milford Sound / Piopiotahi.
Freshwater: Queenstown and Kingston (Lake Wakatipu), Te Anau and Manapouri (Lake Manapouri)

Air transport

Airports

Geography

The east side of the island is home to the Canterbury Plains while the West Coast is famous for its rough coastlines such as Fiordland, a very high proportion of native bush, and Fox and Franz Josef Glaciers.
The dramatic landscape of the South Island has made it a popular location for the production of several films, including The Lord of the Rings trilogy and The Chronicles of Narnia: The Lion, the Witch and the Wardrobe. It lies at similar latitudes to Tasmania (an island south of the Australian mainland), and parts of Patagonia in South America.

Geology

On 4 September 2010, the South Island was struck by a 7.1 magnitude earthquake, which caused extensive damage, several power outages, and many reports of aftershocks. Five and a half months later, 22 February Christchurch earthquake of 6.3 magnitude caused far more additional damage in Christchurch, resulting in 181 deaths. This quake struck at about lunchtime and was centred closer at Lyttelton, and shallower than the prior quake, consequently causing extensive damage.

Climate

The climate in the South Island is mostly temperate. January and February are the warmest months while July is the coldest.

Conditions vary sharply across the regions from extremely wet on the West Coast to semi-arid in the Mackenzie Basin of inland Canterbury. The southern and south-western parts of South Island have a cooler and cloudier climate, with around 1,400–1,600 hours of sunshine annually; the northern and north-eastern parts of the South Island are the sunniest areas and receive about 2,400–2,500 hours.

Natural geographic features

Fiords

The South Island has 15 named maritime fiords which are all located in the southwest of the island in a mountainous area known as Fiordland. The spelling 'fiord' is used in New Zealand rather than 'fjord', although all the maritime fiords use the word Sound in their name instead.

A number of lakes in the Fiordland and Otago regions also fill glacial valleys. Lake Te Anau has three western arms which are fiords (and are named so). Lake McKerrow / Whakatipu Waitai to the north of Milford Sound / Piopiotahi is a fiord with a silted-up mouth. Lake Wakatipu fills a large glacial valley, as do lakes Hakapoua, Poteriteri, Monowai and Hauroko in the far south of Fiordland. Lake Manapouri has fiords as its west, north and south arms.

The Marlborough Sounds, a series of deep indentations in the coastline at the northern tip of the South Island, are in fact rias, drowned river valleys.

Glaciers

Most of New Zealand's glaciers are in the South Island. They are generally found in the Southern Alps near the Main Divide.

An inventory of South Island glaciers during the 1980s indicated there were about 3,155 glaciers with an area of at least . About a sixth of these glaciers covered more than 10 hectares. These include the Fox and Franz Josef glaciers on the West Coast, and the Haupapa / Tasman, Hooker, Mueller and Murchison glaciers in the east.

Lakes

There are some 3,820 lakes in New Zealand with a surface area larger than one hectare. Much of the higher country in the South Island was covered by ice during the glacial periods of the last two million years. Advancing glaciers eroded large steep-sided valleys, and often carried piles of moraine (rocks and soil) that acted as natural dams. When the glaciers retreated, they left basins that are now filled by lakes. The level of most glacial lakes in the upper parts of the Waitaki and Clutha / Mata-Au rivers are controlled for electricity generation. Hydroelectric reservoirs are common in South Canterbury and Central Otago, the largest of which is Lake Benmore, on the Waitaki River.

The South Island has 8 of New Zealand's 10 biggest lakes. They were formed by glaciers and include Lake Wakatipu, Lake Tekapo and Lake Manapouri. The deepest (462 m) is Lake Hauroko, in western Southland. It is the 16th deepest lake in the world. Millions of years ago, Central Otago had a huge lake – Lake Manuherikia. It was slowly filled in with mud, and fossils of fish and crocodiles have been found there.

Volcanoes

There are four extinct volcanoes in the South Island, all located on the east coast.

Banks Peninsula forms the most prominent of these volcanic features. Geologically, the peninsula comprises the eroded remnants of two large shield volcanoes (Lyttelton formed first, then Akaroa). These formed due to intraplate volcanism between about eleven and eight million years ago (Miocene) on a continental crust. The peninsula formed as offshore islands, with the volcanoes reaching to about 1,500 m above sea level. Two dominant craters formed Lyttelton / Whakaraupō and Akaroa Harbours.

The Canterbury Plains formed from the erosion of the Southern Alps (an extensive and high mountain range caused by the meeting of the Indo-Australian and Pacific tectonic plates) and from the alluvial fans created by large braided rivers. These plains reach their widest point where they meet the hilly sub-region of Banks Peninsula. A layer of loess, a rather unstable fine silt deposited by the foehn winds which bluster across the plains, covers the northern and western flanks of the peninsula. The portion of crater rim lying between Lyttelton Harbour / Whakaraupō and Christchurch city forms the Port Hills.

The Otago Harbour was formed from the drowned remnants of a giant shield volcano, centred close to what is now the town of Port Chalmers. The remains of this violent origin can be seen in the basalt of the surrounding hills. The last eruptive phase ended some ten million years ago, leaving the prominent peak of Mount Cargill.

Timaru was constructed on rolling hills created from the lava flows of the extinct Mount Horrible, which last erupted many thousands of years ago.

Te Wāhipounamu World Heritage Site

Te Wāhipounamu (Māori for "the place of greenstone") is a World Heritage Site in the south west corner of the South Island.

It is thought to contain some of the best modern representations of the original flora and fauna present in Gondwanaland, one of the reasons for listing as a World Heritage Site.

Protected areas

Forest parks

There are six forest parks in the South Island that are on public land administered by the Department of Conservation.
 Catlins Forest Park  Situated in the Southland region.
 Craigieburn Forest Park  Situated in the Canterbury Region, its boundaries lie in part alongside  and is adjacent to the eastern flanks of the Southern Alps. The Broken River Ski Area and the Craigieburn Valley Ski Area lie within its borders. The New Zealand Forest Service had used the area as an experimental forestry area and there is now an environmental issue with the spread of wilding conifers.
 Hanmer Forest Park  Situated in the Canterbury Region.
 Lake Sumner Forest Park  Situated in the Canterbury Region.
 Mount Richmond Forest Park  Situated in the Marlborough region.
 Victoria Forest Park  Situated in the West Coast region.

National parks

The South Island has ten national parks established under the National Parks Act 1980 and which are administered by the Department of Conservation.

From north to south, the National Parks are:
 Kahurangi National Park  (4,520 km2, established 1996) Situated in the north-west of the South Island, Kahurangi comprises spectacular and remote country and includes the Heaphy Track. It has ancient landforms and unique flora and fauna. It is New Zealand's second largest national park.
 Abel Tasman National Park  (225 km2, established 1942) Has numerous tidal inlets and beaches of golden sand along the shores of Tasman Bay / Te Tai-o-Aorere. It is New Zealand's smallest national park.
 Nelson Lakes National Park  (1,018 km2, established 1956) A rugged, mountainous area in Nelson Region. It extends southwards from the forested shores of Lake Rotoiti and Rotoroa to the Lewis Pass National Reserve.
 Paparoa National Park  (306 km2, established 1987) On the West Coast of the South Island between Westport and Greymouth. It includes the celebrated Pancake Rocks at Punakaiki.
 Arthur's Pass National Park  (1,144 km2, established 1929) A rugged and mountainous area straddling the main divide of the Southern Alps.
 Westland Tai Poutini National Park  (1,175 km2, established 1960) Extends from the highest peaks of the Southern Alps to a wild remote coastline. Included in the park are glaciers, scenic lakes and dense rainforest, plus remains of old gold mining towns along the coast.
 Aoraki / Mount Cook National Park  (707 km2, established 1953) An alpine park, containing New Zealand's highest mountain, Aoraki / Mount Cook (3,754 m) and its longest glacier, Haupapa / Tasman Glacier (29 km). A focus for mountaineering, ski touring and scenic flights, the park is an area of outstanding natural beauty. Together, the Aoraki / Mount Cook and Westland Tai Poutini National Parks have been declared a World Heritage Site.
 Mount Aspiring National Park  (3,555 km2, established 1964) A complex of impressively glaciated mountain scenery centred on Mount Aspiring / Tititea (3,036 m), New Zealand's highest peak outside of the main divide.
 Fiordland National Park  (12,519 km2, established 1952) The largest national park in New Zealand and one of the largest in the world. The grandeur of its scenery, with its deep fiords, its lakes of glacial origin, its mountains and waterfalls, has earned it international recognition as a world heritage area.
 Rakiura National Park  (1,500 km2, established 2002) On Stewart Island / Rakiura.

Other native reserves and parks
 Hakatere Conservation Park

Natural history

During the Last Glacial Period when sea levels were over 100 metres lower than present day levels, the North and South Islands were connected by a vast coastal plain which formed at the South Taranaki Bight. Similarly, the South Island and Stewart Island / Rakiura were connected by coastal plains which covered modern-day Foveaux Strait. During this period, most of the South Island was covered in grassland and glaciers, compared to the woodlands and rainforest which grew in the more temperate North Island. Sea levels began to rise 7,000 years ago, eventually separating the islands and linking the Cook Strait to the Tasman Sea.

Birds

There are several bird species which are endemic to the South Island. They include the kea, great spotted kiwi, Okarito brown kiwi, South Island kōkako, South Island pied oystercatcher, Malherbe's parakeet, king shag, takahē, black-fronted tern, South Island robin, rock wren, wrybill, and yellowhead.

Many South Island bird species are now extinct, mainly due to hunting by humans and predation by cats and rats introduced by humans. Extinct species include the South Island goose, South Island giant moa, Haast's eagle and South Island piopio.

Tertiary education

The South Island has three universities, and five polytechnic schools. 

 Ara Institute of Canterbury (the result of a merger between Christchurch Polytechnic Institute of Technology (CPIT) and Aoraki Polytechnic)
 Nelson Marlborough Institute of Technology
 Otago Polytechnic
 Southern Institute of Technology (including Telford Rural Polytechnic)
 Tai Poutini Polytechnic

 University of Canterbury
 Lincoln University
 University of Otago

Since 2020, the polytechnics are branches of the New Zealand Institute of Skills and Technology.

Healthcare

Healthcare in the South Island is provided by five District Health Boards (DHBs). Organised around geographical areas of varying population sizes, they are not coterminous with the Local Government Regions.

There are six major hospitals in the South Island: Christchurch Hospital, Dunedin Hospital, Grey Base Hospital (Greymouth), Nelson Hospital, Southland Hospital (Invercargill), and Timaru Hospital. Christchurch Hospital, Dunedin Hospital and Wellington Hospital (in the North Island) are the main tertiary hospitals serving the South Island.

Emergency medical services

There are several air ambulance and rescue helicopter services operating throughout the South Island.

 The Lake Districts Air Rescue Trust operates two AS350BA Squirrels and an AS355 Squirrel from Queenstown Airport.
 The New Zealand Flying Doctor Service operates a Cessna 421 Golden Eagle and a Cessna Conquest C441 from Christchurch International Airport.
 The Otago Rescue Helicopter Trust operates a MBB/Kawasaki BK 117 from Taieri Aerodrome near Mosgiel.
 The Solid Energy Rescue Helicopter Trust operates an AS350BA Squirrel from Greymouth.
 The Summit Rescue Helicopter Trust operates an AS350BA Squirrel from Nelson Airport.
 The Westpac Rescue Helicopter Trust operates a MBB/Kawasaki BK 117 and an AS350BA Squirrel from Christchurch International Airport.

Culture

 Art 

The South Island has contributed to the Arts in New Zealand and internationally through highly regarded artists such as Nigel Brown, Frances Hodgkins, Colin McCahon, Shona McFarlane, Peter McIntyre Grahame Sydney and Geoff Williams.

The University of Canterbury School of Fine Arts was founded in 1950.

South Island Art Galleries include:
 Centre of Contemporary Art
 Christchurch Arts Centre
 Dunedin Public Art Gallery

Language

Parts of the South Island principally Southland and the very southernmost areas of Otago near the border with Southland are famous for its people speaking what is often referred to as the "Southland burr", a semi-rhotic, Scottish-influenced dialect of the English language.

 Media 

 Newspapers 
The South Island has ten daily newspapers and many weekly community newspapers. Major daily newspapers include the Ashburton Guardian, the Greymouth Star, The Marlborough Express, The Nelson Mail, the Oamaru Mail, the Otago Daily Times, The Press, the Southland Times, The Timaru Herald, and the West Coast Times. The Press and the Otago Daily Times, serving mainly Christchurch and Dunedin respectively, are the South Island's major newspapers.

 Television 
The South Island has seven regional stations (either non-commercial public service or privately owned) that broadcast only in one region or city: 45 South TV, Channel 39, Canterbury Television, CUE, Mainland Television, Shine TV, and Visitor TV. These stations mainly broadcast free to air on UHF frequencies; however, some are carried on subscription TV. Content ranges from local news, access broadcasts, satellite sourced news, tourist information and Christian programming to music videos.

 Radio stations 
A large number of radio stations serve communities throughout the South Island; these include independent stations, but many are owned by organisations such as Radio New Zealand, New Zealand Media and Entertainment, and MediaWorks New Zealand.

Museums
 Bluff Maritime Museum
 Cadbury World
 Canterbury Museum
 Ferrymead Heritage Park
 Nelson Provincial Museum
 Olveston House
 Otago Museum
  Otago Settlers Museum: Toitū
 Royal New Zealand Air Force Museum
 Southland Museum and Art Gallery
 World of Wearable Art
 Yaldhurst Museum

Religion

Anglicanism is strongest in Canterbury (the city of Christchurch having been founded as an Anglican settlement).

Catholicism still has a noticeably strong presence on the West Coast, and in Kaikōura. The territorial authorities with the highest proportion of Catholics are Kaikōura (where they are 18.4% of the total population), Westland (18.3%), and Grey (17.8%).

Presbyterianism is strong in the lower South Island – the city of Dunedin was founded as a Presbyterian settlement, and many of the early settlers in the region were Scottish Presbyterians. The territorial authorities with the highest proportion of Presbyterians are Gore (where they are 30.9% of the total population), Clutha District (30.7%), and Southland (29.8%).

The first Muslims in New Zealand were Chinese gold diggers working in the Dunstan gold fields of Otago in the 1860s. Dunedin's Al-Huda mosque is the world's southernmost, and the farthest from Mecca.

Law enforcement

Police

The New Zealand Police is the primary law enforcement agency of New Zealand including the South Island. Three decentralised Police Districts cover the entire South Island with each being commanded by a Superintendent and having a central station from which subsidiary and suburban stations are managed. The Christchurch Police Communications Centre handles all emergency and general calls within the South Island.

The Tasman Police District covers 70,000 kilometres of territory, encompassing the northern and most of the western portion of the South Island. The West Coast alone spans the distance between Wellington and Auckland. There are 22 police stations in the Tasman District, with 6 being sole-charge - or one-person - stations. The Tasman Police District has a total of 302 sworn police officers and 57 civilian or nonsworn staff. Organisationally, the district has its headquarters in Nelson and has three distinct Areas each headed by an Inspector as its commander. The areas are Nelson Bays, West Coast and Marlborough.

The Canterbury Police District is based in Christchurch the largest city in the South Island and covers an area extending from the Conway River, (just south of Kaikōura), to the Waitaki River, south of Timaru.

The Southern Police District with its headquarters in Dunedin spans from Oamaru in the North through to Stewart Island in the far South covers the largest geographical area of any of the 12 police districts in New Zealand. The Southern District has three distinct Areas headed by Inspectors; Otago Rural, Southland and Dunedin.

Correctional facilities
Correctional facilities in the South Island are operated by the Department of Corrections as part of the South Island Prison Region. Christchurch Prison, also known as Paparua, is located in Templeton a satellite town of Christchurch. It accommodates up to 780 minimum, medium, and high-security male prisoners. It was built in 1925, and also includes a youth unit, a self-care unit and the Paparua Remand Centre (PRC), built in 1999 to replace the old Addington Prison. Christchurch Women's Prison, also located in Templeton, is a facility for women of all security classifications. It has the only maximum/medium security accommodation for women prisoners in New Zealand. It can accommodate up to 98 prisoners.

Rolleston prison is located in Rolleston, another satellite town of Christchurch. It accommodates around 320 male prisoners of minimum to low-medium security classifications and includes Kia Marama a sixty-bed unit that provides an intensive 9-month treatment programme for male child sex offenders. Invercargill Prison, in Invercargill, accommodates up to 172 minimum to low-medium security prisoners. Otago Corrections Facility is located near Milton and houses up to 335 minimum to high-medium security male prisoners.

 Customs service 
The New Zealand Customs Service whose role is to provide border control and protect the community from potential risks arising from international trade and travel, as well as collecting duties and taxes on imports to the country has offices at Christchurch International Airport, Dunedin, Invercargill, Lyttelton and Nelson.

Sport

Of the professional sports teams based in the South Island, the major spectator sports of rugby union and cricket are particularly well represented. The Crusaders and Highlanders represent the upper and lower South Island respectively in rugby union's Super Rugby competition; and Canterbury, Otago, Southland Stags, Tasman Makos all participate in provincial rugby's ITM Cup. At cricket, the South Island is represented by the Canterbury Wizards, Central Stags, and Otago Volts in the Plunket Shield, one day domestic series, and the Super Smash.

As well as rugby union and cricket, the South Island also boasts representative teams in the domestic basketball, soccer, ice hockey, netball, and rugby league.

The North vs South match, sometimes known as the Interisland match is a longstanding rugby union fixture in New Zealand. The first game was played in 1897, the most recent one in 2020.

Christchurch hosted the 1974 Commonwealth Games.

 See also 

 Cities and towns of the South Island by population
 List of twin towns and sister cities in the South Island
 Military of the South Island
 New Munster
 Nor'west arch
 South Island nationalism

 References 

 Further reading 
  Atkinson, Brett, et al. New Zealand's South Island'' (2010) excerpt and text search

External links 

 South Island
 South Island Road Map

 
Islands of New Zealand